Wanchai Ferry may refer to:
 Wan Chai Ferry Pier, a ferry pier in Wan Chai, Hong Kong
 Wanchai Ferry (brand), a brand of dumplings and other Chinese foods owned by General Mills